Lake Aschersleben is a former lake in Germany, northeast of the Harz Mountains, south of the town of Aschersleben. The lake was connected to the rivers of Eine and Elke and was about 12 km long.
When the lake began to shrink in the course of the 15th century, a dam was built at the source of the Elke. The lake was completely drained at the beginning of the 18th century by an order of Frederick I.
The lake contains 20-25m thick Pleistocene and Holocene sediments, from the Eemian Stage (previous interglacial period) to the present. Fluviatile, limnic and periglacial sediments interchange. All in all, 11 sedimentation cycles are present.

Lakes of Saxony-Anhalt
Former lakes of Europe